Snap! are a German Eurodance group.

Snap! may also refer to:
 Snap! (album), greatest hits album of The Jam
 Snap! (programming language), browser-based programming language
 SNAP!, a Canadian English-language arts magazine

See also 
 Snap (disambiguation)